The Portland Immigrant Statue is a statue of an immigrant man by Jim Gion, installed near the intersection of Northeast Sandy Boulevard and Killingsworth Street in Portland, Oregon's Parkrose neighborhood, in the United States. The statue was commissioned by the Parkrose Community Foundation to commemorate the neighborhood's centennial anniversary, and installed in 2011.

References

External links

 Portland Immigrant Statue – Portland, OR, USA at Waymarking

2011 establishments in Oregon
2011 sculptures
Outdoor sculptures in Portland, Oregon
Sculptures of men in Oregon
Statues in Portland, Oregon
Parkrose, Portland, Oregon
Works about immigration to the United States